The abbreviation GAFTA can refer to
 Grain and Feed Trade Association
 Council of Arab Economic Unity#Greater Arab Free Trade Area